Esmailabad (also Romanized as Esmā‘īlābādand Isma‘ilābād; also known as Esma-il Abad Hoomeh Zarand) is a village in Mohammadabad Rural District, in the Central District of Zarand County, Kerman Province, Iran. At the 2006 census, its population was 930, in 231 families.

References 

Populated places in Zarand County